Horndon on the Hill is a village, former civil parish and Church of England parish in the unitary authority of Thurrock, in the county of Essex, England. It is located close to the A13, around one mile northwest of Stanford-le-Hope and around two miles northeast of Orsett. The village area falls within the Orsett ward of Thurrock District Council. In 2019 it had an estimated population of 1517. In 1931 the parish had a population of 1052.

Horndon on the Hill has one church, the Church of St Peter and St Paul, which dates from the 13th century and is Grade I listed. It also has a primary school, a recreational park and two public houses, The Swan and The Bell.

History
Horndon-on-the-Hill appears in the Domesday Book of 1086 as Hornindune, meaning "horn-shaped hill". It may have been the site of the 11th-century Horndon mint, based on the survival of a single Anglo-Saxon penny from the village.

In the late 15th century, the lord of the manors of Arden Hall and Horndon House was Sir Edmund Shaa. Shaa was a supporter of Richard III and was knighted by him. These manors remained in the Shaa family for several generations before passing to the Pooley family.

A woolmarket was established in the village in the early 16th century; the building later became a shelter for the poor people of the area.

On the south wall of the church is a memorial to Thomas Higbed, who was burned at the stake in Horndon in 1555 and is included in Foxe's Book of Martyrs.

Horndon on the Hill is one of the seven conservation areas of Thurrock and was the first of the seven to be designated, in September 1969.

Since the 13th century, Horndon on the Hill has hosted the annual "Feast and Fayre" on the last weekend in June.

Prominent residents have included Sir John Tusa, journalist and broadcaster and former President of Wolfson College, Cambridge.

Philip Conrad Vincent, founder & Designer of Vincent Motorcycles Great Britain, lived in Horndon on the-Hill, and his final resting place is in the Parish cemetery of St Peter and St Paul in the centre of the village.

Governance 
Horndon on the Hill belonged to the Barstable hundred of Essex, before becoming part of Orsett Rural District in 1894 and then part of Thurrock Urban District on 1 April 1936 when the parish was abolished to form Thurrock. In 1974, the urban district became the Borough of Thurrock under the Local Government Act 1972. The borough was given administrative independence from Essex County Council in 1998.

References

External links

Villages in Essex
Former civil parishes in Essex
Thurrock